Anna Bondár and Lara Salden were the defending champions but chose not to participate.

Fernanda Contreras and Lulu Sun won the title, defeating Valentini Grammatikopoulou and Anastasia Tikhonova in the final, 7–5, 6–2.

Seeds

Draw

Draw

References
Main Draw

Edge Open Saint-Gaudens Occitanie - Doubles